The Khamet language may refers to one or two closely Palaungic language(s) in mainly-Tai peoples area: 
 The Khamet language (Yunnan) ([kʰɤ˧˩met˥˧])
 The Khamet language (Laos) ([kʰəmɛːt])

The exact positions both languages/varieties in Palaungic are unclear and the two languages/varieties might be one.